Sheikh Abdul Latif Derian is the Grand Mufti of Lebanon since August 2014. As the spiritual leader of Lebanese Muslims, the Grand Mufti holds the highest religious post for a Sunni Islamic scholar in Lebanon. The honorific his eminence is used in referring to him.

References

Living people
Grand Muftis of Lebanon
1953 births